Kamyar Abdi (born 1969) is an Iranian archaeologist. He is the editor of the Iranian Journal of Archaeology and History, a research associate at the Iranian Center for Research on Humanities and Cultural Studies, and professor at Department of Archaeology at Shiraz University. He was the deputy director of the National Museum of Iran in 2011.

Biography
Kamyar Abdi was born in 1969 in Tabriz, Iran. Abdi received his M.A. degree in Near Eastern Languages and Civilizations at University of Chicago (1997). He continued his studied and received his Ph.D. from University of Michigan in Anthropology (2002), his advisor was Henry T. Wright and his dissertation was titled "Strategies of herding: Pastoralism in the middle Chalcolithic period of the West Central Zagros Mountains". From 2002 until 2008, he was an Assistant Professor in the Department of Anthropology, Dartmouth College. 

His research interests include sedentism, food production (agriculture and pastoralism), and political developments in the ancient Near East, especially Iran. He has directed archaeological projects at Malyan (ancient Anshan), Arjan, Sorkh Dom Lori, and  Ziviyeh.

In the late 1990s he led the Islamabad Archeological Research Project which discovered an ancient Neanderthal tooth which has been extensively studied, and as of 2019, it has confirmed the existence of Neanderthals in Iran roaming in the Zagros Mountains as far back as 40 to 70 thousand years ago.

He also formerly was a visiting professor at Department of Archaeology in Tarbiat Modarres University in Tehran. In 2017 he joined Shiraz University as a Full Professor.
At present, he teaches at the Shahid Beheshti University

Published work
Abdi, K. (2001) Nationalism, Politics, and the Development of Archaeology in Iran, American Journal of Archaeology 105/1: 51-76.
Abdi, K. (2003) The Early Development of Pastoralism in the Central Zagros Mountains, Journal of World Prehistory, Vol. 17, No. 4: 395-448.
Abdi, K. (2007) The Name Game: Persian Gulf, Archaeologists, and Politics of Arab-Iranian Relations. In Selective Remembrances: Archaeology in the Construction, Commemoration, and Consecration of National Pasts. Philip Kohl, Mara Kozelsky, and Nachman Ben-Yehuda, eds. pp. 206–243. Chicago: The University of Chicago Press.
Abdi, K. (2008) From Pan-Arabism to Saddam Husayn's Cult of Personality: Ancient Mesopotamia and Iraqi Nationalism. Journal of Social Archaeology 8/1: 3–34.
Abdi, K. (2012) The Iranian Plateau from Paleolithic Period to the Rise of the Achaemenid Empire. In Oxford Handbook on Iranian History. Edited by Touraj Daryaee. pp. 13–36. Oxford: Oxford University Press.
Abdi, K. (2013) Theory and Method in Archaeology: How Can We Integrate the Two to Arrive at a Better 	Understanding of the Past and Apply Archaeology to Present and Future Problems More Efficiently. Payām-e Bāstānshenās 17: 17–30.
Abdi, K. (2014) The Pre-Imperial Persians at the Land of Anshan: Some Preliminary Observations. In Excavating an Empire: Achaemenid Persia in Longue Durée, edited by T. Daryaee, A. Mousavi and Kh. Rezakhani. pp. 73–87.  Costa Mesa CA: Mazda Publishers.
Naomi F. Miller and Kamyar Abdi (eds.) (2003) Yeki Bud, Yeki Nabud: Essays on Iranian Archaeology in Honor of William M. Sumner. Philadelphia and Los Angeles: Costen Institute of Archaeology of the UCLA and American Institute of Iranian Studies.
Susan Pollock, Reinhard Bernbeck and Kamyar Abdi (eds.) (2010) Toll-e Bashi: A Neolithic Village in Kur River Basin, Iran. Berlin: Deutsches Archäologisches Institut-Eurasien Abteilung.

See also
Kor River

References

External links
 Dartmouth faculty webpage

Iranian archaeologists
Living people
Iranian emigrants to the United States
Horace H. Rackham School of Graduate Studies alumni
University of Chicago alumni
1969 births
 Dartmouth College faculty
American people of Iranian descent
Iranian academics
American academics